The Crook Point Bascule Bridge (or the Seekonk River Drawbridge) is a defunct Scherzer rolling lift railway bridge which spans the Seekonk River, connecting the city of Providence, Rhode Island, to the city of East Providence. Stuck in the open position since its abandonment in 1976, it is known to nearby residents as the "Stuck-Up Bridge" and has become somewhat of a local icon of urban decay.

History 

Part of the East Side Railroad Tunnel project, the Crook Point Bascule Bridge was built in 1908 to provide a direct connection to the old Union Station along the New York, New Haven and Hartford Railroad line. When railroad usage declined in the 1970s and plans were made to demolish Union Station, the East Side Railroad Tunnel and the Seekonk River Drawbridge were subsequently abandoned in 1976 with the bridge fixed in its current open position to allow river transit.

Decay 
Since its abandonment, the bridge has been a target of graffiti, vandalism, and artistic and archaeological interest. The western entrance to the bridge is easily accessible from a paved bike path off of an athletic field near the intersection of Gano and Williams streets. Some wooden components of the tracks have rotted or burnt away, and various electrical cables have been disconnected, but the metal structure remains largely intact, albeit rusted. This combination of factors attracts various types of visitors to venture out onto the tracks and even climb up the drawbridge, despite highly dangerous conditions. Students from nearby colleges have also produced photography projects, documentaries, and studies featuring the bridge. One study by a Brown University archaeology student suggests that the bridge has functioned as a center of athletic initiation, punk counterculture gathering, and even suicide since 1976.

Future 

In 2003, Brown graduate Robert Manchester proposed a $30-million plan calling for the development of Crook Point, which includes the eastern landing of the bridge. Featured in his proposal were plans to reopen the bridge and tunnel as a light rail system, bringing commuters from East Providence to Thayer Street and downtown Providence.

In May 2006, Mayor David Cicilline organized Transit 2020, an advisory group determined to find alternative transit solutions for Providence in order to overcome some limitations of RIPTA, on which it depends heavily. Included in Transit 2020's first report was an analysis describing the East Side Railroad Tunnel and Seekonk River Bridge line as a potential corridor for a light rail or bus rapid transit system.

In 2018, RIDOT indicated plans to demolish the bridge in 2026-2027. In 2019, the city offered to take ownership of the bridge to prevent demolition. The city held a design contest for reuse of the bridge; the winning proposal, announced in June 2021, would turn the trestle sections of the bridge into a public park. On June 29, 2021, the bascule span was damaged by a fire of unknown origin. A RIDOT inspection in July found that the steel structure was not damaged, allowing plans to transfer ownership to the city to move forward.  Despite this, by mid-2022 all plans to convert the bridge into a park have since been indefinitely postponed or canceled.  There are no current plans to redevelop or demolish the bridge.

See also 

India Point Railroad Bridge
Sakonnet River rail bridge

References

External links 

 360-degree Interactive Panorama
 Rhode Island Art In Ruins: Seekonk River Bridge
 Urbanism in the Archaeological Record
 Transit2020.com
 Bridge video
 Another article about the bridge

Railroad bridges in Rhode Island
Bascule bridges in the United States
Bridges in Providence County, Rhode Island
Bridges completed in 1908
Former railway bridges in the United States
Landmarks in Rhode Island
1908 establishments in Rhode Island
Steel bridges in the United States